Dipsas sanctijoannis, the tropical snail-eater, is a non-venomous snake found in Colombia.

References

Dipsas
Snakes of South America
Reptiles of Colombia
Endemic fauna of Colombia
Reptiles described in 1911
Taxa named by George Albert Boulenger